Tanvi Kishore Parab (born 24 July) is an Indian actress and model, who works predominantly in Marathi, Hindi and Konkani cinemas. She marked her debut in 2011 with Raada Rox and is notable for her performance in Sagar Ballary's debut Marathi movie Bhatukali

Early life 
Tanvi Kishore was born to Kishore Parab and Ketki Parab in Bahrain. From the age of four, Kishore did print shoots for local brands in the UAE. She did her schooling in Dubai and decided to shift to India for her further education, her junior college being Fergusson College in Pune. Her exotic looks and striking personality comes from being Dubai-raised and a multi-linguist with her knowledge and ability to speak 11 languages.

Career 
While she was pursuing her business studies in Pune, she became the youth icon of Pune at a prestigious intercollege competition, which bagged her several ad campaigns, one of them being PassPass. Her cousin recommended her name to a friend for the lead girl's casting of Raada Rox, while still in college. Kishore made her debut with Raada Rox and was spotted by Balaji Telefilms' casting director for the role of an NRI girl, in their first Marathi daily soap. She says getting into the film industry was a pure accident. After doing Marathi and Hindi films, Kishore did her first Konkani cinema O La La, where she is the leading lady alongside veterans of the Goan industry. Having learnt 11 languages including Hindi, Marathi, English, German, Arabic, Urdu, Konkani, Kishore expresses her interest in doing films in different languages.

Filmography

Movies

TV serials

Web series

References

External links
 
 

Living people
Indian film actresses
Indian television actresses
Indian web series actresses
Marathi actors
Actresses in Marathi cinema
Actresses in Hindi cinema
Actresses in Konkani cinema
Actresses in Malayalam cinema
Actresses in Hindi television
Actresses in Marathi television
Female models from Maharashtra
Indian expatriates in Bahrain
Indian expatriates in the United Arab Emirates
Fergusson College alumni
Year of birth missing (living people)
21st-century Indian actresses